"When You Kiss Me" is a song recorded by Canadian singer Shania Twain. It was the seventh single overall released from her fourth studio album Up! (2002). The song was written by Twain and her then-husband Robert John "Mutt" Lange. Twain described on several occasions that "When You Kiss Me" is her favorite ballad off Up!. Twain also performed the song on the Up! Tour.

The song found mild success in Europe and Australia, and it was the only non-single from the album to chart on the Billboard Country Chart in the United States. Although, the music video was later released to CMT in that country. In the British Isles, "When You Kiss Me" was released as a double A-side with "Up!", but was overpowered by the latter single. The DVD release of the song marked Shania's first and only DVD single.

Critical reception
"When You Kiss Me" was received positively by critics. About.com compared it to "You're Still the One" and complimented the "stupendous mandolin and steel guitar textures overlaid by a wonderful chorus lyric".

Music video
The music video for "When You Kiss Me" was shot in Takapuna, New Zealand by director Paul Boyd. It was shot around the same time as "Forever and for Always" in March 2003. It was originally released in Europe on October 17, 2003 and then in North America during the summer of 2004, to replace the video for "It Only Hurts When I'm Breathing". Two versions of the video exist, one which is called the 'One-Take Version' is solely of Twain on a beach at night, with the camera only taking "one take". The main version is of Shania being filmed in a house, on a boat and on the beach by a young male. Both videos were filmed in black and white. The 'One-Take Version' is available on select CD singles and the DVD single.

Chart performance
In the United Kingdom and Ireland, "When You Kiss Me" was released as a double A-side single with "Up!". On November 23, 2003 it debuted at number 21 on the UK Singles Chart, making it her lowest-peaking single at the time. It only spent five weeks on the chart. In Ireland, the song debuted at number 41 on November 20 then fell off the chart the next week. Although the double A-side underperformed in the British Isles, "When You Kiss Me" managed to hit number four in Portugal and make the top 40 in Germany and Austria. The lower than usual peaks can be attributed to Twain's health, as she had to cancel several promotional performances since at the time she was sick. When Up! was released in 2002, "When You Kiss Me" gained enough album play to reach number 60 on the Billboard Hot Country Singles & Tracks chart, making it her first single to miss the top 20 since "Rock This Country!" (2000). It is also her only single from Up! to miss the Top 20 and her least-successful single (released in the US) on the chart to date.

Track listings
These are the formats for the major releases.

German and Australian CD maxi
"When You Kiss Me" (Red) – 4:08
"I'm Gonna Getcha Good!" (Live from Chicago) – 4:47
"Ka-Ching!" (Live from Chicago) – 3:41
Enhanced: When You Kiss Me – Music Video

German 3-inch CD single
"When You Kiss Me" (Red) – 4:08
"When You Kiss Me" (Metro Remix – Extended Mix) – 6:55

European CD single
"When You Kiss Me" (Red) – 4:08
"When You Kiss Me" (Metro Mix Extended) – 6:55

UK CD single – "When You Kiss Me / Up!"
"When You Kiss Me" (Red) – 4:08
"Up! (Red)" – 2:53
"I'm Gonna Getcha Good!" (Live from Chicago) – 4:30
Enhanced: "When You Kiss Me" – Music Video
Enhanced: "Up!" (Excerpt) – Video

UK CD single – "Up! / When You Kiss Me"
"Up! (Red) – 2:53
"When You Kiss Me" (Red) – 4:08
"Ka-Ching!"(Live from Chicago) – 3:20
Enhanced: "Up!" – Music Video

UK DVD single – "When You Kiss Me / Up!"
"When You Kiss Me" – Video
"Up!" – Audio
"When You Kiss Me" (Metro Remix Extended) – Audio
"Up!" – Video Excerpt

Official versions
Red Album Version (4:08)
Green Album Version (4:07)
Blue Album Version (3:56)
Metro Remix Radio Edit (3:54)
Metro Remix Extended Mix (6:55)
Live From Chicago (4:16)

Charts

Release history

References

2002 songs
2003 singles
Country ballads
Mercury Records singles
Mercury Nashville singles
Music videos directed by Paul Boyd
Shania Twain songs
Song recordings produced by Robert John "Mutt" Lange
Songs written by Robert John "Mutt" Lange
Songs written by Shania Twain